Paracanthopterygii is a superorder of fishes. Members of this group are called paracanthopterygians.

It includes five orders:
 †Sphenocephaliformes
 Percopsiformes (trout-perches & allies)
 Zeiformes (dories)
 Stylephoriformes (Tube-eyes)
 Gadiformes (cods & allies)

References 

 
Fish superorders